Four Walls is a 1928 American silent drama film directed by William Nigh and starring John Gilbert, Joan Crawford, and Carmel Myers. The film is based on the play of the same name by George Abbott and Dana Burnet. Four Walls is now considered lost.  The film was remade in 1934 as Straight Is the Way.

Plot

Benny Horowitz (John Gilbert), a reformed gangster, proposes marriage to Bertha (Carmel Myers), a neighbor who had been a frequent visitor while he served his sentence.  Bertha rejects his proposal because she believes that he is still in love with Freida (Joan Crawford), Benny's former gun moll.  During a party in which Freida seeks to make Benny jealous with a former rival, Benny again takes control of the gang's leadership.  After his rival's death is  ruled accidental, Benny and Bertha go off together and start a new life.

Cast
John Gilbert - Benny
Joan Crawford - Frieda
Vera Gordon - Benny's Mother
Carmel Myers - Bertha
Robert Emmett O'Connor - Sullivan
Louis Natheaux - Monk
Jack Byron - Duke Roma

References

External links
 
 
 

1928 films
1928 drama films
Silent American drama films
American silent feature films
American black-and-white films
American films based on plays
Films directed by William Nigh
Lost American films
Metro-Goldwyn-Mayer films
1928 lost films
Lost drama films
1920s American films